Solférino is a commune in the Landes department in Nouvelle-Aquitaine in southwestern France.

It was created in 1863 by Napoléon III by uniting several neighboring communities. It is named after the Battle of Solferino.

Population

See also

Communes of the Landes department
Parc naturel régional des Landes de Gascogne

References

Communes of Landes (department)